Edwin Bowman is a former Democratic member of the West Virginia Senate, representing the 1st District from 1994 to 2010.

External links
West Virginia Legislature - Senator Edwin Bowman official government website
Project Vote Smart - Senator Edwin Bowman Jr. (WV) profile
Follow the Money - Edwin Bowman
2008 2006 2004 2002 1998 Senate campaign contributions

West Virginia state senators
1946 births
Living people
21st-century American politicians